William John Russo (June 19, 1947 – September 29, 2021) was an American football coach. He served as the head football at Wagner College from 1978 to 1980 and at Lafayette College from 1981 to 1999. In 23 seasons as a head coach, Russo compiled a 118–113–4 overall record. In 1988, 1992 and 1994 Russo coached the Lafayette Leopards to outright Patriot League conference titles. Russo received the Eddie Robinson Award in 1988, which is given annually to the nation's top coach in NCAA Division I Football Championship Subdivision (formerly Division I-AA). Russo's 103 wins at Lafayette are the most of any head coach in the program's history.

Head coaching record

References

1947 births
2021 deaths
Brown Bears football coaches
Lafayette Leopards football coaches
Wagner Seahawks football coaches
Brown University alumni
Sportspeople from Asheville, North Carolina